The 2019–20 season will be Veszprém KC's 39th competitive and consecutive season in the Nemzeti Bajnokság I and 42nd year in existence as a handball club.

Players

Squad information

Goalkeepers
1  Arpad Sterbik
 12  Márton Székely
 16  Vladimir Cupara
Left Wingers
2   Dejan Manaskov
 26  Manuel Štrlek
Right Wingers
 17  Dragan Gajić
 24  Gašper Marguč
Line players
 13  Rogério Moraes Ferreira
 18  Andreas Nilsson 
 31  Blaž Blagotinšek

Left Backs
 25  Rasmus Lauge Schmidt
 30  Mirsad Terzić
 51  Borut Mačkovšek
 87  Vuko Borozan
Central Backs
 34  Petar Nenadić
 35  Kentin Mahé
 66  Máté Lékai (c)
Right Backs
5  Yahia Omar
 15  Kent Robin Tønnesen
 22  Paweł Paczkowski

Transfers
Source:  hetmeteres.hu

 In:
 William Accambray (loan from  Celje)
 Gábor Ancsin  (loan from Ferencváros)
 Vladimir Cupara (from  Kielce)
 Rogério Moraes Ferreira (from  Vardar)
 Patrik Ligetvári (loan from  Ademar León)
 Yahia Omar (from  Zamalek)
 Paweł Paczkowski (loan from  Kielce)
 Rasmus Lauge Schmidt (from  Flensburg)
 Márton Székely  (from Tatabánya)

 Out:
 William Accambray (loan to  Meskov Brest) 
 Gábor Ancsin (loan to Tatabánya)
 Momir Ilić (retired)
 Iman Jamali (to  Dinamo București)
 Patrik Ligetvári (loan to  Logroño)
 Roland Mikler (to Szeged)
 László Nagy (retired)
 René Toft Hansen (to  Benfica)

Club

Technical Staff

Source: Coaches, Staff

Uniform
Supplier: hummel
Main sponsor: Telekom / tippmix / Euroaszfalt / Jysk / City of Veszprém
Back sponsor: Duna Aszfalt / Euronics
Shorts sponsor: MKB Bank / SEAT

Competitions

Overview

Nemzeti Bajnokság I

Results by round

Matches

Results overview

Hungarian Cup

Matches

Cancelled due to the COVID-19 pandemic.

EHF Champions League

Group stage

Matches

Results overview

Knockout stage

Round of 16

SEHA League

Group phase

Matches

Results overview

Knockout stage

Quarterfinals

Statistics

Top scorers
Includes all competitive matches. The list is sorted by shirt number when total goals are equal.
Last updated on 28 December 2019

Attendances

List of the home matches:

References

External links
 
 Telekom Veszprém at eurohandball.com

 
Veszprém KC